Splanchnic is usually used to describe organs in the abdominal cavity.

It is used when describing:
 Splanchnic tissue
 Splanchnic organs - including the stomach, small intestine, large intestine, pancreas, spleen, liver, and may also include the kidney.
 Splanchnic nerves
 Splanchnic mesoderm
 Splanchnic circulation – the circulation of the gastrointestinal tract originating at the celiac trunk, the superior mesenteric artery and the inferior mesenteric artery.

History and etymology

The term "splanchnologia" is used for grouping in Nomina Anatomica, but not in Terminologia Anatomica. It includes most of the structures usually considered "internal organs", but not all (for example, the heart is excluded).

References

Organs (anatomy)